The Men’s Champions Invitational was a round-robin tournament played at the 2007 US Open tennis championships in New York City, USA. Four former tennis champions ("Legends") – Jimmy Arias of the USA, Pat Cash of Australia, Henri Leconte of France, and Todd Martin of the USA – played off against one another to determine the champion. The winner was Todd Martin.

Draw

Round robin

Champion
 Todd Martin

Men's Champions Invitational